"Secret" is a 1985 song by English electronic band Orchestral Manoeuvres in the Dark (OMD), released as the second single from their album Crush. Paul Humphreys sings lead vocals on the track. It became their second US Billboard Hot 100 entry, peaking at number 63, and also made number 34 on the UK Singles Chart.

The song was featured in the 1988 movie Arthur 2: On the Rocks and on its soundtrack album; it was also re-released to radio in the US as the follow-up to The Best of OMD track "Dreaming", approximately one month prior to the movie's premiere. Though it received renewed airplay on several US contemporary hit stations, it did not re-chart on the Hot 100.

Critical reception
Writing in Number One, Stuart Husband referred to "Secret" as a "pretty song" and "the Manoeuvres' cutest single for many a moon". Stateside, the Gavin Report dubbed it "the strongest OMD track since the tragically overlooked 'Souvenir'." Bill Merrill of the Altus Times noted the song's "smooth combination of airy vocals and catchy hooks", while Cashbox called it a "strong" and "very melodic" track with a "gently pulsing synth beat".

In a retrospective review, Dave Thompson of AllMusic observed an "emotive love song buried in an over-produced behemoth of a backing". Conversely, Thompson's colleague Mike DeGagne lauded the track as one of OMD's best 1980s singles, noting its "adolescent innocence". Rolling Stones Paul Evans described "Secret", and previous release "So in Love", as "flawless singles".

Kevin Hearn of Canadian rock band Barenaked Ladies recalled being "in love with the song" and recording a cover version with his high school band. In a poll of 6,852 Slicing Up Eyeballs readers, "Secret" was voted the 74th-best track of 1985.

B-sides
The UK B-side "Drift" was an instrumental song written by Paul Humphreys and Martin Cooper. "Drift" has never been released on CD. The US B-Side "Firegun" is a vocal song credited to the whole band that was later released on their 2001 CD compilation Navigation: The OMD B-Sides. "Firegun" was released in the UK as the B-side to the band's successive single "La Femme Accident".

Music video
The video for "Secret", directed by Andy Morahan, shows various vintage black & white film clips, including footage of the Beatles, interspersed with new black & white footage of Humphreys and a woman processed to look like old home movies; additionally there are colour scenes of Humphreys singing. The theme is that a woman deserts her current love interest (McCluskey) to return to the arms of her true love (Humphreys). McCluskey's character observes the two lovers together and, though despondent, gallantly accepts that his love interest should instead be with Humphreys' character, before walking into the distance along the shore. The clip was filmed at Walton-on-the-Naze, Essex.

Live performances
The song was part of the setlist during the Crush tour in 1985 and 1986, although more recently it has largely been performed at gigs in the US. A video recording of a short concert held in Rotterdam, the Netherlands in aid of Greenpeace on 26 October 1985 shows that Humphreys shared the lead vocal with Andy McCluskey.

Track listing

7": Virgin / VS 796 (UK)
 "Secret" – 3:54
 "Drift" – 4:14

12": Virgin / VS 796-12 (UK)
 "Secret" (extended mix) – 6:14
 "Drift" – 4:14

7" A&M/Virgin /  AM-2794 (US)
 "Secret" – 3:54
 "Firegun" – 4:36

Initial releases had a bonus disc with:

 "Red Frame/White Light"
 "I Betray My Friends"

Charts

Cover versions
A cover of the song by Laura Watling appeared on the 2001 compilation Pretending to See the Future: A Tribute to OMD.

References in other media
The hit Canadian teen drama Degrassi: The Next Generation, which was known for naming episodes in its early seasons after '80s hit songs, named a two-part episode after this song. It was also featured in the 2014 film The Skeleton Twins.

References

External links

1985 songs
1985 singles
Music videos directed by Andy Morahan
Orchestral Manoeuvres in the Dark songs
Song recordings produced by Stephen Hague
Songs written by Paul Humphreys
Songs written by Andy McCluskey
Virgin Records singles